Thomas Hand was an English painter who was known as a follower and imitator of George Morland. He died in London in September 1804.

Works
Hand exhibited a landscape with the Incorporated Society of Artists in 1790. From 1792 to 1804, he occasionally exhibited at the Royal Academy. Some of his pictures were close enough to Morland's manner to have been misattributed.

Notes

Attribution

Year of birth unknown
Date of death unknown
Place of birth unknown
1804 deaths
18th-century English painters
English male painters
18th-century English male artists